Puerto Rico, an unincorporated territory of the United States, is among the one hundred countries that have submitted films for the Academy Award for Best International Feature Film. The award is handed out annually by the United States Academy of Motion Picture Arts and Sciences to a feature-length motion picture produced outside the United States that contains primarily non-English dialogue.

The Puerto Rican nominee was selected by the Corporación de Cine de Puerto Rico. However, the territory is no longer allowed to submit films due to the Academy altering its rules to disqualify films from American protectorates.

Submissions
Every year, each country is invited by the Academy of Motion Picture Arts and Sciences to submit its best film for the Academy Award for Best Foreign Language Film. The Foreign Language Film Award Committee oversees the process and reviews all the submitted films. Following this, they vote via secret ballot to determine the five nominees for the award.

The following is a list of the films submitted by Puerto Rico in the Best Foreign Language Film category at the Academy Awards. All films were produced in Spanish.

The producers of local box-office hit Talento de Barrio protested that they submitted their film for consideration in 2008, but that Puerto Rico's film board chose not to send a film that year.

Since foreign language films produced in the United States are not permitted to compete in this category, Puerto Rican filmmakers were often cited as the only American citizens who are regularly able to compete for the award.

Notes

References

External links 

 Caribe Movie Review, Variety

Best Foreign Language Film Academy Award submissions by country
 Academy Award for Best Foreign Language Film
Lists of American films
Academy Award